Eboo Patel is an American Ismaili of Gujarati Indian heritage and founder and president of Interfaith America (previously known as Interfaith Youth Core), a Chicago-based international nonprofit that aims to promote interfaith cooperation.  Patel was a member of President Barack Obama's inaugural Advisory Council on Faith-Based Neighborhood Partnerships.

Biography 

Patel grew up in Glen Ellyn, Illinois, where he attended Glenbard South High School. He attended the University of Illinois at Urbana-Champaign for his undergraduate studies and earned a degree in Sociology. He has a doctorate in the sociology of religion from Oxford University, where he studied on a Rhodes Scholarship.

Patel details his life and career extensively in his 2007 autobiography, Acts of Faith. In the book, Patel notes that he became interested in religious diversity in college, where he noticed that conversations on multiculturalism and multiple identities did not involve religious identity. After graduating from college, he taught at an alternative education program for high school dropouts in Chicago and, inspired partly by Dorothy Day’s Catholic Worker movement, founded a cooperative living community for activists and artists in Chicago’s Uptown neighborhood. As an activist, Patel felt that diversity, service, and faith were important parts of civic life but found no community organization that touched on all three, specifically one that worked with young people. In response, he developed the idea for the Interfaith Youth Core, formulated through his relationship with Brother Wayne Teasdale and blessed by the Dalai Lama, that would bring young people of different faiths together around service and dialogue.

While a student at Oxford, Patel ran numerous interfaith youth projects in India, Sri Lanka, and South Africa. He officially founded IFYC in 2002 with a Jewish friend and a $35,000 grant from the Ford Foundation. Today the organization employs approximately 30 people and has a $4-million operating budget.

In addition to his work with IFYC, Patel has spoken at numerous college campuses and conferences across the country. Patel and IFYC partnered with White House officials in developing President Obama’s Interfaith and Community Service Campus Challenge, which invited schools across the nation to make interfaith cooperation a campus priority and launched in 2011. His second book, Sacred Ground: Pluralism, Prejudice, and the Promise of America, was released in August 2012.

Work 
 Patel has blogged for The Washington Post, The Huffington Post, USA Today, and Sojourners, among other outlets.
 He is on the Religious Advisory Committee of the Council on Foreign Relations, the National Committee of the Aga Khan Foundation
 He was on the Advisory Board of Duke University Islamic Studies Center.
 Patel is an Ashoka Fellow, part of a select network of social entrepreneurs.
 He is serving as Dominican University's Lund-Gill Chair in the Rosary College of Arts and Sciences for fall 2011.
 Patel serves on the Department of Homeland Security’s Faith-based Advisory Council
 He has spoken at TED (conference), the Clinton Global Initiative, and the Nobel Peace Prize Forum
He wrote "We Are Each Other's Business".

Awards 
 Sandor Teszler Award for Moral Courage and Service to Humanity, Wofford College, Spartanburg, SC, March 5, 2013
 2012 Guru Nanak Interfaith Prize, 2012
 Honoree at Union Theological Seminary (New York)’s 175th Anniversary, 2012
 Named to 100 Most Powerful Chicagoans List by Chicago (magazine), 2012
 Named to the “YES! Breakthrough 15” List by YES! Magazine, 2011
 Named to the “Top 50 Power and Influence” List by The NonProfit Times, 2011
 Feature article in The New York Times, “An Effort to Foster Tolerance in Religion,” 2011
 University of Illinois Outstanding Asian-American Alumni Award, 2010
 Common Ground Award given by Search for Common Ground, 2010
 University of Louisville  in Religion, 2010
 Young Global Leader, World Economic Forum, 2010
 Roosevelt Institute’s Freedom of Worship Medal (with Interfaith Youth Core), 2009
 Stanford University Muslim American Contribution Award, 2009
 Named one of Islamica Magazine's 10 young Muslim visionaries shaping Islam in America
 Named one of “America’s Best Leaders” by U.S. News & World Report, 2009
 Named a “Future Policy Leader” by Harvard Kennedy School Review, 2008
 David Kellum award from the Baha'i House of Worship in Wilmette for service to youth, 2005
 Ashoka Foundation Fellow, 2004
 Prime Mover/Hunt Fellow, 2004
 Leadership Greater Chicago Fellow, 2003

Honorary degrees
DePaul University, June 16, 2013
 Claremont Lincoln University, May 21, 2013
 Doctor of Humanities, Wofford College, Spartanburg, SC, March 5, 2013
 Colgate University, 2012
 Dominican University (Illinois), 2012
 Illinois Institute of Technology, 2011
 Loyola University Chicago, 2010
 Elmhurst College, 2009
 Washington & Jefferson College, 2008

Bibliography

References

External links 

https://web.archive.org/web/20090211145215/http://ifyc.org/about_core/staff, Bio at IFYC

https://www.npr.org/2005/11/07/4989625/we-are-each-others-business Eboo Patel on This I Believe - NPR, Nov. 7, 2005.
https://www.npr.org/2007/07/19/12098469/walking-the-faith-line-with-eboo-patel Eboo Patel on Talk of the Nation - NPR, July 19, 2007.
Voices on Antisemitism Interview with Eboo Patel from the US Holocaust Memorial Museum
Morning Chai: Ismailis in the News - Eboo Patel named to Obama Inter Faith Council Ismailis in the News - Eboo Patel named to Obama Inter Faith Council

Ashoka USA Fellows
Year of birth missing (living people)
Living people
American Ismailis
American Rhodes Scholars
American political consultants
American male writers of Indian descent
People from Glen Ellyn, Illinois
University of Illinois Urbana-Champaign alumni
American people of Gujarati descent
Recipients of the Four Freedoms Award